The men's discus throw at the 2013 World Championships in Athletics was held at the Luzhniki Stadium on 12–13 August.

The three automatic qualifiers turned out to be the three players in this event.  On the second throw of the competition Piotr Małachowski took the lead which lasted for about a minute before Gerd Kanter made his first attempt.  It was Robert Harting's second attempt that took the lead he would not relinquish.  In the fourth round he unleashed his winner at 69.11.  Between World Championships and Olympics, he continued his streak of four straight golds.  Małachowski's fifth round 68.36 continued his streak of three silvers behind Harting in the same championships.  Kanter, Harting's predecessor in both titles, held on for bronze.

Records
Prior to the competition, the records were as follows:

Qualification standards

Schedule

Results

Qualification
Qualification: 65.00 m (Q) and at least 12 best (q) advanced to the final.

Final
The final was started at 19:00.

References

External links
Discus throw results at IAAF website

Discus throw
Discus throw at the World Athletics Championships